Metropolitan House, also known as 1 Hagley Road, is a commercial building that has been developed into apartments in Birmingham, England. It is situated on the A456 Hagley Road at Five Ways. It was designed by John Madin.

Radio transmitters
The building hosts several radio transmitting antennas on its roof. These include:

Capital Birmingham - 102.2 MHz FM
CE Digital (DAB digital radio) - Block 11C: 220.35 MHz
 South Birmingham (small-scale DAB digital radio) - Block 9C: 206.35 MHz
An EE mobile telecommunications Base Transceiver Station and Base Station Controller

Renovation
In 2012, under owners Global Henderson, a planning application to convert the building into 182 flats and add 4 penthouse floors was accepted. Seven Capital acquired 1 Hagley Road in August 2013 and optimised the planning consent to 271 flats with no alterations to the exterior of the building. One, two and three bedroom apartments were marketed at between £130,000 and £250,000.

See also
 List of tallest buildings and structures in Birmingham

References

External links

Emporis entry
Skyscrapernews entry
Transmission Gallery entry

Buildings and structures in Birmingham, West Midlands
John Madin